Kacper Mieczysław Łopata (born 27 August 2001) is a Polish professional footballer who plays as a centre-back. He is currently a free agent. Besides England, he has played in Poland.

Club career

Brighton Hove & Albion
In November 2018, Łopata joined Premier League side Brighton & Hove Albion from Bristol City. In August 2019, he joined Whitehawk on loan. He went on to make 19 appearances in all competitions for the Isthmian League South East Division side. In January 2020, Łopata joined Polish I liga side Zagłębie Sosnowiec on loan until the end of the season. On 29 February 2020, he made his professional debut in a 2–0 win over Miedź Legnica. He was released by Brighton at the end of the 2019–20 season

Sheffield United
On 25 August 2020, Łopata joined Sheffield United. On 10 August 2021, he made his debut for Sheffield United, playing the full match in a 1–0 win over Carlisle United in the EFL Cup. On 28 October 2021, he was loaned to National League side Southend United, initially until January 2022, along with fellow Sheffield player Zak Brunt. Faced with injuries, Sheffield recalled Łopata on 12 March 2022.

Southend United
Having spent half-a-year on loan with the club in the previous season, on 2 September 2022 Łopata joined Southend United on a permanent basis for an undisclosed fee, signing a two-year deal with an option for another year. In March 2023, he terminated his contract with the club, apparently unhappy at how players had been treated over unpaid wages.

International career
Łopata has represented Poland at under-18, under-19, under-20 and under-21 levels.

Personal life
Łopata moved to Bristol with his mother aged 9.

Career statistics

References

External links

2001 births
Living people
Polish footballers
Association football defenders
Footballers from Kraków
Polish expatriate footballers
Brighton & Hove Albion F.C. players
Whitehawk F.C. players
Zagłębie Sosnowiec players
Sheffield United F.C. players
Southend United F.C. players
Isthmian League players
I liga players
Poland youth international footballers
Poland under-21 international footballers
Expatriate footballers in England
Polish expatriate sportspeople in England
National League (English football) players